Mark "Bomber" Thompson (born 19 November 1963) is a retired Australian rules footballer and former senior coach. He played 202 games for the Essendon Football Club from 1983 to 1996, captaining the side from 1992 until 1995.

After retiring, he was an assistant coach at Essendon and then at North Melbourne before becoming the senior coach of the Geelong Football Club from 2000 to 2010 and coaching them to two premierships. He left the club at the end of 2014.

On 2 May 2018, he was charged with seven counts of drug trafficking and possession. He was released on $20,000 bail to appear in court at a later date. He was later cleared of trafficking but convicted of possession.

Playing career

Essendon
Thompson played for Essendon Football Club from 1983 until 1996, playing a total number of 202 games and kicked a total of 50 goals. Thompson played most of his football in the backline, gaining a reputation as a fierce competitor. He won the club award for "Most Determined Player" in 1984 and 1986, "Most Improved Player" and "Best Clubman" in 1985, and best-and-fairest awards in 1987 and 1990. He also finished in the top five in the best-and-fairest on four other occasions. Thompson played in the 1984 and 1985 premiership sides and captained the 1993 premiership team. In 2002, Thompson's contribution to the club was recognised when he was voted the 20th best Essendon player of all time in the "Champions of Essendon" list.

Coaching career

Essendon Football Club (1997-1998)
After Thompson retired as a player, Thompson became an assistant coach at Essendon Football Club under senior coach Kevin Sheedy for the 1997 season and 1998 season.

North Melbourne Football Club (1999)
In 1999, Thompson joined the North Melbourne Football Club as an assistant coach under senior coach Denis Pagan in what became a premiership year for the Kangaroos in the 1999 season, when North Melbourne defeated Carlton in the 1999 Grand Final to win the premiership.

Geelong Football Club (2000–2010)
Thompson was appointed as Geelong Football Club senior coach at the end of the 1999 season, for the 2000 season when he replaced Gary Ayres, who quit as Geelong Football Club senior coach.  As Geelong Football Club senior coach, Thompson was given an extended time to rebuild the club's playing list. The side finished 5th in the 2000 season in his first season as senior coach but was bundled out by 8th placed Hawthorn in the first week of the finals in the first finals match ever held at the Docklands Stadium. The club performed poorly for the next three seasons, missing the top 8. Thompson's position looked in danger, but in the 2004 season the side was a big improver, finishing fourth and making the Preliminary Finals. Due to his success in reinvigorating the club, Thompson's contract was extended until 2007. The following year (2005) the club finished sixth and was beaten in the Semi-Finals by 3 points against the eventual premiers Sydney after leading for the majority of the match.

In the 2006 season, however, the side eventually missed the finals after winning the NAB Cup and winning their first two matches in convincing style, leading them into flag favouritism. It was also a season where Thompson had used the 2005 semi-final loss to the Swans as motivation. Following a Round 22 61-point demolition at the hands of lower-placed Hawthorn, Thompson's job was under immense pressure.

After a very public review of the club, it was decided that Thompson should keep his job as senior coach. After a shaky start to the 2007 season that led many supporters to believe that nothing had changed from the 2006 season Thompson led his team to a massive 15 match winning streak (the biggest in a single season in club history) and a 106-point win against the Kangaroos in the Qualifying Final which is the 5th biggest finals winning margin in AFL/VFL history.

2007 then culminated in one of the biggest, if not the best highlight of Thompson's career, in both a coaching and footballer's role. Thompson coached Geelong to win the AFL premiership by more than 100 points, which was the highest winning margin in Grand Final history, against Port Adelaide Football Club at the MCG on 29 September. It was the club's first premiership since 1963, the year of Thompson's birth.

After the Essendon Football Club decided not to give Thompson's former mentor, Kevin Sheedy, a renewal of contract, there was speculation that Mark Thompson would take up the senior coaching role at Essendon for the 2008 season. However, with trade week quickly approaching, the club instead appointed Matthew Knights to the position.

After their record-breaking win in the grand final, Thompson's Cats were red hot favourite to repeat their 2007 success and their form during the year did nothing to change that.  The Cats went 21–1 to claim the McClelland Trophy four games ahead of their nearest challenger, Hawthorn.  After relatively easy wins against St Kilda and the Western Bulldogs in the finals, Geelong were into their second straight grand final, this time against Hawthorn, and were again hot favourites.  In an upset, though, the Hawks beat Geelong by 26 points in front of 100,012 fans in the 2008 AFL Grand Final.

During an end-of-season holiday to New York that year, Thompson ran into Melbourne Storm coach Craig Bellamy whilst inside a hotel. They were said to have drowned their sorrows following their respective Grand Final losses (Bellamy's Melbourne Storm lost the 2008 NRL Grand Final to Manly).

In 2009, following a heartbreaking loss to Hawthorn in the 2008 Premiership decider, Geelong compiled an 18–4 record during the minor round and disposed of the Western Bulldogs and then Collingwood during the finals series. On 26 September, 2009 in the 2009 AFL Grand Final his Cats faced a St Kilda side determined to break its 43-year Premiership drought. In front of 99,251 fans on a rain-soaked MCG deck, the Cats clawed their way back after trailing at every break to win by 12 points. This would be Geelong's second flag in three years cementing their place as one of the great teams of the modern era. Thompson as always was magnanimous in victory and accepted the AFL Premiership trophy alongside Geelong legend Bob Davis.

After Geelong were eliminated from the preliminary finals to Collingwood, at the conclusion of the 2010 season, on 4 October 2010, Thompson announced his retirement and resignation as Geelong Football Club senior coach effective immediately, his reason being that he was "tired of coaching" after a decade at the helm. Thompson was replaced by Chris Scott as Geelong Football club senior coach.

Return to Essendon Football Club (2010–2014)
On 10 November 2010, Thompson signed a lucrative contract to return to Essendon as the senior assistant coach under senior coach James Hird, putting an end to weeks of speculation following his resignation from Geelong. According to football writer and commentator Caroline Wilson's sources, his contract was said to be worth $650,000 per year. He was appointed the senior coach for the 2014 season while James Hird served his suspension, and left the club after Hird returned as senior coach at the end of that year.

2013 supplements controversy
Following months of rumours and investigations, on 13 August 2013, Thompson, along with the Essendon Football Club, senior coach James Hird, football manager Danny Corcoran and club doctor Bruce Reid, were charged by the AFL with bringing the game into disrepute in relation to the supplements program at the club in 2011 and 2012. The club was given 14 days to consider the charges and faced an AFL Commission hearing on 26 August 2013. On 27 August 2013, Thompson was fined $30,000 for his role in the supplements saga.

Legal Issues
On 2 May 2018, he was charged with seven counts of drug trafficking and possession. He was released on $20,000 bail to appear in court at a later date. He was later cleared of trafficking but convicted of possession.

Statistics

Playing statistics

|-
|- style="background-color: #EAEAEA"
! scope="row" style="text-align:center" | 1983
|style="text-align:center;"|
| 26 || 2 || 1 || 0 || 22 || 10 || 32 || 3 ||  || 0.5 || 0.0 || 11.0 || 5.0 || 16.0 || 1.5 || 
|-
|style="text-align:center;background:#afe6ba;"|1984†
|style="text-align:center;"|
| 26 || 20 || 4 || 3 || 203 || 143 || 346 || 60 ||  || 0.2 || 0.2 || 10.2 || 7.2 || 17.3 || 3.0 || 
|- style="background-color: #EAEAEA"
|style="text-align:center;background:#afe6ba;"|1985†
|style="text-align:center;"|
| 26 || 23 || 5 || 5 || 261 || 188 || 449 || 71 ||  || 0.2 || 0.2 || 11.3 || 8.2 || 19.5 || 3.1 || 
|-
! scope="row" style="text-align:center" | 1986
|style="text-align:center;"|
| 26 || 22 || 2 || 3 || 247 || 192 || 439 || 93 ||  || 0.1 || 0.1 || 11.2 || 8.7 || 20.0 || 4.2 || 
|- style="background-color: #EAEAEA"
! scope="row" style="text-align:center" | 1987
|style="text-align:center;"|
| 26 || 18 || 16 || 9 || 217 || 131 || 348 || 75 || 32 || 0.9 || 0.5 || 12.1 || 7.3 || 19.3 || 4.2 || 1.8
|-
! scope="row" style="text-align:center" | 1988
|style="text-align:center;"|
| 26 || 0 || — || — || — || — || — || — || — || — || — || — || — || — || — || —
|- style="background-color: #EAEAEA"
! scope="row" style="text-align:center" | 1989
|style="text-align:center;"|
| 26 || 10 || 0 || 1 || 134 || 76 || 210 || 40 || 10 || 0.0 || 0.1 || 13.4 || 7.6 || 21.0 || 4.0 || 1.0
|-
! scope="row" style="text-align:center" | 1990
|style="text-align:center;"|
| 26 || 24 || 7 || 8 || 321 || 198 || 519 || 114 || 28 || 0.3 || 0.3 || 13.4 || 8.3 || 21.6 || 4.8 || 1.2
|- style="background-color: #EAEAEA"
! scope="row" style="text-align:center" | 1991
|style="text-align:center;"|
| 26 || 9 || 6 || 3 || 106 || 58 || 164 || 35 || 9 || 0.7 || 0.3 || 11.8 || 6.4 || 18.2 || 3.9 || 1.0
|-
! scope="row" style="text-align:center" | 1992
|style="text-align:center;"|
| 26 || 21 || 5 || 2 || 300 || 169 || 469 || 81 || 22 || 0.2 || 0.1 || 14.3 || 8.0 || 22.3 || 3.9 || 1.0
|- style="background-color: #EAEAEA"
|style="text-align:center;background:#afe6ba;"|1993†
|style="text-align:center;"|
| 26 || 21 || 2 || 0 || 330 || 180 || 510 || 91 || 25 || 0.1 || 0.0 || 15.7 || 8.6 || 24.3 || 4.3 || 1.2
|-
! scope="row" style="text-align:center" | 1994
|style="text-align:center;"|
| 26 || 13 || 1 || 1 || 140 || 84 || 224 || 51 || 19 || 0.1 || 0.1 || 10.8 || 6.5 || 17.2 || 3.9 || 1.5
|- style="background-color: #EAEAEA"
! scope="row" style="text-align:center" | 1995
|style="text-align:center;"|
| 26 || 11 || 0 || 2 || 99 || 65 || 164 || 32 || 10 || 0.0 || 0.2 || 9.0 || 5.9 || 14.9 || 2.9 || 0.9
|-
! scope="row" style="text-align:center" | 1996
|style="text-align:center;"|
| 26 || 8 || 1 || 1 || 84 || 42 || 126 || 37 || 12 || 0.1 || 0.1 || 10.5 || 5.3 || 15.8 || 4.6 || 1.5
|- class="sortbottom"
! colspan=3| Career
! 202
! 50
! 38
! 2464
! 1536
! 4000
! 783
! 167
! 0.2
! 0.2
! 12.2
! 7.6
! 19.8
! 3.9
! 1.2
|}

Coaching statistics

|- style="background-color: #EAEAEA"
! scope="row" style="text-align:center; font-weight:normal" | 2000
|style="text-align:center;"|
| 23 || 12 || 10 || 1 || 54.3% || 5 || 16
|-
! scope="row" style="text-align:center; font-weight:normal" | 2001
|style="text-align:center;"|
| 22 || 9 || 13 || 0 || 40.9% || 12 || 16
|- style="background-color: #EAEAEA"
! scope="row" style="text-align:center; font-weight:normal" | 2002
|style="text-align:center;"|
| 22 || 11 || 11 || 0 || 50.0% || 9 || 16
|-
! scope="row" style="text-align:center; font-weight:normal" | 2003
|style="text-align:center;"|
| 22 || 7 || 14 || 1 || 34.1% || 12 || 16
|- style="background-color: #EAEAEA"
! scope="row" style="text-align:center; font-weight:normal" | 2004
|style="text-align:center;"|
| 25 || 16 || 9 || 0 || 64.0% || 4 || 16
|-
! scope="row" style="text-align:center; font-weight:normal" | 2005
|style="text-align:center;"|
| 24 || 13 || 11 || 0 || 54.2% || 5 || 16
|- style="background-color: #EAEAEA"
! scope="row" style="text-align:center; font-weight:normal" | 2006
|style="text-align:center;"|
| 22 || 10 || 11 || 1 || 47.7% || 10 || 16
|-
|style="text-align:center;background:#afe6ba;"|2007†
|style="text-align:center;"|
| 25 || 21 || 4 || 0 || 84.0% || 1 || 16
|- style="background-color: #EAEAEA"
! scope="row" style="text-align:center; font-weight:normal" | 2008
|style="text-align:center;"|
| 25 || 23 || 2 || 0 || 92.0% || 1 || 16
|-
|style="text-align:center;background:#afe6ba;"|2009†
|style="text-align:center;"|
| 25 || 21 || 4 || 0 || 84.0% || 2 || 16
|- style="background-color: #EAEAEA"
! scope="row" style="text-align:center; font-weight:normal" | 2010
|style="text-align:center;"|
| 25 || 18 || 7 || 0 || 72.0% || 2 || 16
|-
! scope="row" style="text-align:center; font-weight:normal" | 2014
|style="text-align:center;"|
| 23 || 12 || 10 || 1 || 54.3% || 7 || 18
|- class="sortbottom"
! colspan=2| Career totals
! 283
! 173
! 106
! 4
! 61.8%
! colspan=2|
|}

Honours and achievements

Playing honours
Team
VFL/AFL Premiership (Essendon): 1984, 1985, 1993 (C)
McClelland Trophy (Essendon): 1984, 1985, 1990, 1993 (C)
AFL Pre-Season Cup (Essendon): 1993 (C)
Night Series Winner (Essendon): 1984

Individual
W. S. Crichton Medal (Essendon F.C. B&F): 1987, 1990
Essendon F.C. Best Clubman Award: 1985
Essendon F.C. Most Determined Player Award: 1984, 1986
Essendon F.C. Most Improved Player Award: 1985
State of Origin Representative Honours: 1986
Essendon F.C. Captain: 1992–1995
Essendon F.C. Team of the Century - Back Pocket
Champions of Essendon - 20th

Coaching honours
Team
VFL/AFL Premiership (Geelong): 2007, 2009
McClelland Trophy (Geelong): 2007, 2008
Pre-Season Cup (Geelong): 2006, 2009

Individual:
Jock McHale Medal: 2007, 2009
All-Australian: 2007, 2009
AFLCA Coach of the Year Award: 2007, 2008
Victorian Coach for AFL Hall of Fame Tribute Match: 2008

References

External links

 
 Mark Thompson coaching record and statistics at FootyWire.com

1963 births
Living people
Australian rules footballers from Melbourne
Essendon Football Club players
Essendon Football Club Premiership players
Essendon Football Club coaches
Champions of Essendon
Geelong Football Club coaches
Geelong Football Club Premiership coaches
All-Australian coaches
Crichton Medal winners
Three-time VFL/AFL Premiership players
Two-time VFL/AFL Premiership coaches